Ragan-Brown Field House is a 2,500-seat multi-purpose arena located on the campus of Guilford College in Greensboro, North Carolina known for its distinctive cathedral-like wooden ceiling.

The arena is named in honor of Herbert and Elizabeth Ragan and Edwin and Dorothy Brown and was dedicated in 1980. In 2003 the arena underwent a substantial renovation project and currently serves as the home for the Guilford Quakers basketball and volleyball programs.

References

External links 
 Ragan-Brown Field House

Basketball venues in North Carolina
College volleyball venues in the United States
Guilford Quakers basketball
Sports venues in Greensboro, North Carolina
1980 establishments in North Carolina
Sports venues completed in 1980
College basketball venues in the United States